The khrui is a light outer garment worn as a gown or robe in certain ceremonial settings in Thailand. It is long-sleeved and open at the front, and is made of a sheer or mesh fabric, lined with a band of satin, felt or other material, and may be exquisitely embroidered. Dating from at least the 17th century, it was originally worn only in the royal court, but nowadays is most recognisable as the form of academic dress employed by many universities, especially Chulalongkorn University.

History
The exact origins of the khrui are not known, although it has been postulated that it was likely of Persian and/or Indian import.  The earliest documentation of its use are from illustrations of the French embassy to King Narai in 1685 and that of Siam to France in 1686, showing the Siamese king and ambassadors wearing such garments. Use of the khrui continued into the Rattanakosin period, as evidenced by mention in the 1804 Law of Three Seals prohibiting its use by junior government officials.

King Vajiravudh (Rama VI) further codified the khrui'''s use by royal ordinance in 1912, specifying the different types and ranks to be worn by entitled royals and government officials. He later also granted permission for it to be used as the academic dress of the Royal Pages School (Vajiravudh College) in 1913 and Siam's Bar Association in 1915. It was adopted as the academic dress for graduates of Chulalongkorn University in 1930. Since 1967, some other universities have also adopted the khrui as their academic regalia, and the term khrui has acquired the more general meaning of any style of academic or court dress.

Appearance

The khrui is a tailored robe, usually knee-to-calf-length, with long sleeves and an open front. It is made of a sheer or mesh fabric, usually white in colour, giving it a translucent appearance. The entire rim and the ends of the sleeves are lined with bands of a thicker material, usually satin, felt, or a substitute, with another like pair of bands encircling the sleeves above elbow level. When used as academic dress, these bands usually bear specific patterns denoting the wearer's affiliated institution and academic degree. When used in ceremonial settings by senior government officials or royalty, the gown may be embroidered with certain patterns of goldwork depending on the rank of the wearer. Khrui used as royal attire differ further in certain details, and may be made of coloured or gold cloth.

UseKhrui traditionally denoted royal or noble status, and was worn only by men. Members of the royal family would first use it during their sokan (topknot-cutting) ceremony. The king would wear it on special occasions such as his coronation, royal processions or when receiving special audiences. Its use by nak—novices preparing to undergo upasampada (Buddhist ordination)—is the only occasion where the khrui is worn regardless of a person's social rank.

According to the 1912 ordinance, persons may be entitled to wear khrui through rank, office, or further royal permission. Entitled ranks include Grand Companions and above of the Order of Chula Chom Klao and Knight Commanders and above of the Orders of the White Elephant or the Crown of Thailand. Judges may wear it during full dress royal ceremonies; other government officials may wear it during such ceremonies if they are performing certain addresses, or if it has been specified for the occasion. Such occasions are nowadays rare, though the khrui is still seen in the ceremonial costumes worn during the annual Royal Ploughing Ceremony and occasional royal processions.

Today, the khrui'' is most readily identified as the academic dress of several Thai universities, Chulalongkorn University being its oldest and most prominent adopter. It is worn without a cap, over the university's dress uniform (usually a raj pattern jacket and white trousers for males, white blouse and navy skirt for females) for undergraduate degrees, or a suit and tie for graduate degrees. Like most of its counterparts, it use in this form is usually seen only during graduation ceremonies.

Gallery

Royal gowns

Official gowns

"Nobleman's Gown"

"Ministerial Gown"

Academic gowns

See also 
 Academic dress of Chulalongkorn University

Footnotes

References

Thai clothing
Robes and cloaks
Academic dress